Oboý railway station is the small railway station near Oboý  settlement in Bereket District, Balkan Province, Turkmenistan. It was built in 2014.

The station is operated by a state owned company Türkmendemirýollary.

Oboý Station is one of the railway stations located on the North-South Transnational Railway (Russia - Kazakhstan - Turkmenistan - Iran - Persian Gulf.

See also 
 Railway stations in Turkmenistan
 Transport in Turkmenistan
 North-South Transnational Railway

References

Railway stations in Turkmenistan
Railway stations opened in 2014
2014 establishments in Turkmenistan